Eva Lena Daun (born 1969) is a Swedish former professional tennis player who competed under her maiden name, Eva Lena Olsson.

Olsson twice made WTA Tour main draw appearances as a doubles player, at the 1988 Swedish Open and 1990 Estoril Open. She also featured in qualifying for the 1990 Wimbledon Championships.

ITF finals

Doubles: 8 (1–7)

References

External links
 
 

1969 births
Living people
Swedish female tennis players
20th-century Swedish women
21st-century Swedish women